"I Love You, Goodbye" is a song by Canadian singer Céline Dion from her 1992 self-titled English album. The song was written by prolific American songwriter Diane Warren. It was released as a promo single in the Philippines in 1992 with "I Feel Too Much" as a B-side taken from Unison album. The song became popular in different countries. In 1998, the song was featured in the Philippine drama Halik Sa Apoy on GMA Network.

Entertainment Weekly editor Arion Berger called this song "pleasantly innocuous".

Content
The song is about a woman who wishes to keep being with her lover, but she foresees that their relationship will not work out in the end, and it will be a lie or sin if they continue with the relationship pretending that they are all each other needs; the woman still expresses that they must never regret the good  of this relationship as well, which is why the title, I Love You, Goodbye.

Nina version

"I Love You Goodbye" is the fourth and final commercial single from Filipino singer Nina's successful 2005 album Nina Live!. The song was recorded on January 30, 2005, at PHI Resto and Bar, Metrowalk, Pasig, Philippines. It peaked at the top 5 of Philippine music charts. It was performed by Nina on vocals and Chris Buenviaje on acoustic guitar, and doesn't feature the other members of The Essence band.

The song was released on digital download through iTunes and Amazon.com.

Music video

Two music videos were released for "I Love You Goodbye." The first one is part of her Nina Live! recording sessions, which features Nina and Chris Buenviaje, lead guitarist of The Essence band. Accompanying the song's release as commercial single, a "non-live" music video was later filmed which received heavy rotation on Philippine music channels.

The official music video was shot at a bus stop where Nina is seen wearing pink outfit and jacket. She portrays a girl who plans to break-up with her boyfriend despite remaining in-love with the guy. While waiting at the bus stop, she sees young and old couples passing by. When her fiancé finally arrives, she returns the ring that he gave her, believing that she has to leave for the good. As the video fades, Nina is shown sitting on a director's chair at the bus stop.

Chart position
On June 12, 2017, the official Philippine Billboard charts was launched. "I Love You Goodbye" debuted at number 8 on the Catalog Chart, a chart for local songs that were released for over three years in the Philippines but still generate sales and streaming activity data. It stayed in the position for three consecutive weeks before it eventually peaked at number 3 on the week of August 7, 2017.

Other cover versions
 In 1997, the promotional compilation of songs written by Diane Warren, A Passion for Music was released, including the original demo of the song sung by Susie Benson.
 In December 2009, Filipina acoustic singer Juris covered the song and it was used as theme song for the film of the same name.
 In August 2021, Filipina YouTuber Claudine Co covered the song and it was used as theme song for the film A Faraway Land.

References

1992 singles
2005 singles
1992 songs
Nina Girado songs
Songs written by Diane Warren
Celine Dion songs
1990s ballads
Songs written for films